St Paul's is a Church of England church in the Georgian St Paul's Square in the Jewellery Quarter, Birmingham, England.

History

The Grade I listed church was designed by Roger Eykyn of Wolverhampton. Building started in 1777, and the church was consecrated in 1779. It was built on land given by Charles Colmore from his Newhall estate. It was the church of Birmingham's early manufacturers and merchants - Matthew Boulton and James Watt had their own pews, which were bought and sold as commodities at that time.

It is a rectangular church. The upper part of the tower and spire was added between 1822 and 1823, designed by Francis Goodwin and built by Standbridge and Company.

In 1841 the church became a parish in its own right, with land taken from that of St Martin in the Bull Ring. In 1947, St Mark's Church, King Edward's Road was demolished, and the parish was joined with that of St Paul's.

Bomb damage from the Second World War was repaired between 1949 and 1951 when much of the roof was replaced. The church undertook another restoration between 1985 and 1994. A peal of 10 bells was installed in 2005.

Stained glass
The east window has an important enamelled stained-glass window made in 1791 by Francis Eginton and modelled an altarpiece painted c. 1786 by Benjamin West, now in the Dallas Museum of Art. It shows the Conversion of Paul.

In the south-east nave there is a window by Ward and Hughes of c. 1880. The remaining windows are by Pearce between 1900 and 1907, and a modern window by Rachel Thomas in the north aisle dating from 2000.

Organ

The first documented organ in St Paul's was built in 1830 by James Bishop. It was sited on the gallery at the west end of the church. Banfield enlarged the organ in 1838 including a new Swell division which was probably a replacement for Bishop's Swell rather than an addition. Bevington and Sons rebuilt and enlarged the organ in 1871 and again worked on it in 1897.

The organ was moved to its present location in 1927 by Conacher Sheffield & Co. and was extensively rebuilt. However, the organ case could not be accommodated in its new position unaltered. The wings had to be removed and are now joined together to serve as the screen facing the north gallery, along with some recycled pew doors. The side towers could not fit between the mouldings on the north arcade bases, so the entire case-front was raised so that the corbels of the side towers cleared the mouldings. This caused the side-tower cornices to conflict with the arcade capitals, so the cornices were removed.

Following war damage and the resulting weather-related damage, the organ was noted to be in a poor state by 1953, notably the Choir division was completely 'bombed out'. Hill, Norman & Beard remodelled the organ as a two manual and pedal instrument in 1964. This is the organ present today albeit with some additions to the piston system added in 1996. There are a mixture of mechanical and electro-pneumatic actions and soundboards of differing compasses. The pipework consists of some of the original Bishop ranks, some second hand pipework from Hill Norman & Beard's stock in 1964 and one partly new stop – the Great Stopped Diapason.

List of organists

James Kempson c. 1780
Jeremiah Clark c. 1800
William Ward
Thomas Munden ???? -  1838
George Hollins 1838 - 1841
James Stimpson 1842 - ????
Mr. Evans c. 1852
Frederick Barnby 1857–1859 (afterwards organist of Montreal Cathedral)
John Pearce ???? - 1870 (afterwards organist of St. Thomas' Church, Birmingham)
Frederick Harrod 1870 - ????
Bernard Farebrother 1873 - ???? (afterwards organist of Holy Trinity Church, Birchfield)
George John Halford
Cyril Raymond Mapstone 1961 - 1986
Howard Chapman 1986 - 1988
Andrew Hudson 1988 - 1991
Andrew Burling 1991 - 1992
John Pryer 1992 - 1995
 Dr. Stephen Lansberry 1995
Gareth Perkins 1995 - 1997
David Griffiths 1997 - 2001
Kevin Gill 2001 - 2003
Paul Carr 2003 - 2016
Joshua Roebuck 2016 - 2017
Joshua Hughes 2018 - 2020
Dylan McCaig 2021 - 2023
Darren Hogg 2023 - present

Bells
The first ring of bells was added in 2005. Prior to this the church had three bells used as a service bell and clock chimes. A new ring of ten bells was installed to celebrate the 250th anniversary of the St.Martin's Guild of Church Bell Ringers and officially opened on 25 November 2005. The tenor weighs .

Notable burials
William Hollins (1763-1843), architect and sculptor (monument in church)

See also
List of works by Francis Goodwin

References

Further reading
The Jewellery Quarter - History and Guide, Marie Elizabeth Haddleton, 
Pevsner Architectural Guides - Birmingham, Andy Foster, 2005,

External links

St Paul's Church Website

Birmingham, Saint Paul's Square
Birmingham
Churches completed in 1777
18th-century Church of England church buildings
Grade I listed buildings in Birmingham